The China Pavilion is a Chinese-themed pavilion that is part of the World Showcase within Epcot at Walt Disney World in Orlando, Florida, United States. Its location is between the Norway and Germany pavilions.

Layout
Visitors enter the China Pavilion through a large Chinese gate. The courtyard is dominated by a replica of the Temple of Heaven, which contains the entrance to "Reflections of China", a Circle-Vision 360° movie exploring China's history and scenery, as well as a museum containing several ancient Chinese artifacts. The courtyard is bordered by shops selling Chinese merchandise, and two Chinese restaurants. The pavilion is decorated with ponds, crossed by bridges. Chinese acrobats also perform frequently in the pavilion.

The pavilion served as the backdrop for the music video of the song "Reflection", performed by a then-unknown Christina Aguilera, from the 1998 Disney film Mulan.

Attractions and services

Attractions
Circle-Vision 360°:
 Reflections of China (2003 - Present)
 DuckTales World Showcase Adventure (2022 - Present)

Future Attractions
Circle-Vision 360°:
 Wondrous China (Opening in 2023)

Former Attractions
Circle-Vision 360°:
 Wonders of China (1982-2003)
 Kim Possible World Showcase Adventure (2009 - 2012)
 Agent P World Showcase Adventure (2012 - 2020)

Shopping
Good Fortune Gifts, sells a variety of items including parasols, puppets, toys and hats.
House of Good Fortune, sells items such as housewares, tea sets, wall prints, silk robes, and porcelain goods.

Dining
 Nine Dragons Restaurant, a full-service gourmet Chinese restaurant featuring traditional Chinese cuisine with a twist.
 Lotus Blossom Cafe, a counter-service restaurant that serves well-known American-Chinese dishes.

Live entertainment
 Dragon Legend Acrobats, a team of young acrobats who perform feats in the outdoor courtyard.

Character Meet & Greets
 Mulan, Mushu, and Captain Li Shang.

Gallery

References

External links

 Walt Disney World Resort - Reflections of China
 Walt Disney World Resort - Nine Dragons Restaurant
 China Pavilion Photo Gallery

Chinese-American culture
Walt Disney Parks and Resorts attractions
Epcot
World Showcase
1982 establishments in Florida